Cassier's Magazine: An Engineering Monthly was an engineering magazine, published by the Cassier Magazine Company from 1891 to 1913.

History
The magazine was established by Louis Cassier (1862–1906) in 1891. He was the editor until his death in the 1906 Salisbury rail crash. Henry Harrison Suplee (1856 – after 1943) then took over as the publisher. The headquarters was in New York City. Its London edition was launched in the autumn of 1894.
The magazine ceased publication in 1913.

References

External links
Cassier's Magazine at the Smithsonian Libraries

1891 establishments in New York (state)
1913 disestablishments in New York (state)
Defunct magazines published in the United States
Engineering magazines
Magazines disestablished in 1913
Magazines established in 1891
Magazines published in New York City
Monthly magazines published in the United States
Science and technology magazines published in the United States